Dead Man's Burden is a 2012 Western film directed by Jared Moshe. The film premiered on June 16, 2012, at the Los Angeles Film Festival and stars Barlow Jacobs and Clare Bowen as two siblings that reunite over the death of their father and a potential sale of their land.

Plot
Martha and her husband Heck are two hardy settlers trying to survive in New Mexico after the end of the Civil War and the death of Martha's father. They're given hope for a better life when a mining company shows interest in purchasing their homestead, but things become tense when Martha's brother Wade, who defected to the Union Army returns home after hearing of their father's death – unaware that Martha herself was the one who brought about his demise.

Cast
 Barlow Jacobs as Wade McCurry
 Clare Bowen as Martha Kirkland
 David Call as Heck Kirkland
 Joseph Lyle Taylor as E.J. Lane
 Richard Riehle as Three Penny Hank
 Jerry Clarke as Sheriff Deacon
 Adam O'Byrne as Archie Ainsworth
 Travis Hammer as Ben Ainsworth
 Luce Rains as Joe McCurry
 William Sterchi as WC Claymore

Production
When writing the script for Dead Man's Burden, Moshe wrote with the intent to cast the film with lesser known actors, as he didn't want "to bring in a big-name actor who didn’t look like they belong in that period." Moshe did not use storyboards, as the film had a tight budget and couldn't afford a storyboard artist, instead watching other Western films for inspiration and working closely with cinematographer Robert Hauer. Filming took place in New Mexico over an 18-day period, where the cast experienced freak storms that forced the cast to walk to the set but did not delay filming.

Reception
On Rotten Tomatoes the film has an approval rating of 74% based on reviews from 19 critics. On Metacritic the film has a score of 76% based on 12 reviews, indicating "generally favorable reviews".

Common elements praised in the film was Moshé's choice in cast, which Variety lauded as a highlight. In their mostly positive review IndieWire remarked that the lack of major stars and the choice to film a Western (which they saw as a "mostly defunct genre") could jeopardize commercial prospects. The New York Daily News's review was more mixed, as they felt that the "verbose period film has the complicated plot and tight pacing of a cable TV drama, which is then squashed into an indie-film paradigm."

References

External links
 
 
 
 
 

2012 films
2012 directorial debut films
2012 independent films
2012 Western (genre) films
American Western (genre) films
American independent films
Films set in New Mexico
Films shot in New Mexico
Films directed by Jared Moshe
2010s English-language films
2010s American films